The Boar's Head Resort Women's Open (formerly known as the Boyd Tinsley Clay Court Classic) is a tournament for professional female tennis players played on outdoor clay courts. The event is classified as a $60,000 ITF Women's Circuit tournament and has been held annually in Charlottesville, Virginia, United States, since 2002.

Past finals

Singles

Doubles

External links
 ITF search

ITF Women's World Tennis Tour
Clay court tennis tournaments
Tennis tournaments in the United States
Recurring sporting events established in 2002
Tennis in Virginia
Charlottesville, Virginia
Women in Virginia